Gymnopilus decurrens is a species of mushroom-forming fungus in the family Hymenogastraceae.

Description

Habitat and distribution
Gymnopilus decurrens fruits on pine, and has been found in California.

See also

List of Gymnopilus species

References

decurrens
Fungi of North America
Fungi described in 1969
Taxa named by Lexemuel Ray Hesler